Storhøi is a mountain in Lom Municipality in Innlandet county, Norway. The mountain is surrounded by several other notable mountains including Lendfjellet to the north; Lomseggi to the northeast; Store Lauvhøi to the east; Galdhøpiggen to the south; Steinahøfjellet to the west, and Hesthøi, Sandgrovhøi, and Moldulhøi to the northwest.

See also
List of mountains of Norway

References

Lom, Norway
Mountains of Innlandet